"Am I the Only One" (Dierks Bentley song), a 2011 song by Dierks Bentley
"Am I the Only One" (Aaron Lewis song), a 2021 song by Aaron Lewis